The Paiute Wilderness is an 87,900 acre (355 km²) wilderness area located in the northwestern part of the U.S. state of Arizona. The wilderness is administered by the Bureau of Land Management. The southern section of the wilderness lies within Grand Canyon-Parashant National Monument, and is also managed by the BLM. Directly to the north, separated by Interstate Highway 15, lies the Beaver Dam Mountains Wilderness.

See also
 Wilderness Act
 List of U.S. Wilderness Areas
 List of Arizona Wilderness Areas

References
 Wilderness.net Paiute Wilderness page, accessed August 25, 2010.

Protected areas of the Mojave Desert
Wilderness areas of Arizona
Protected areas of Mohave County, Arizona
Bureau of Land Management areas in Arizona
Protected areas established in 1984
1984 establishments in Arizona